William H. Brandenburg is a retired major general in the United States Army.  He last served as deputy commanding general, U.S. Army, Pacific, August 8, 2003. Prior to his last assignment, he was deputy commanding general for training and readiness, I Corps and Fort Lewis. From November 29, 2004, until December 1, 2005, he deployed to Iraq as deputy commanding general (detainee operations) and commanding general, Task Force 134.

He is a native of Elloree, South Carolina. He is a 1973 graduate from The Citadel, where he received a commission in infantry.  He is the son of Brigadier General William H. Brandenburg Sr., (The Citadel, 1943) and Doris Brandenburg, who served as a nurse during World War II. He currently resides in Hawaii with his wife Sybil.  The couple has one son.

Assignments
4th Infantry Division (Mechanized)
1st Battalion, 22d Infantry, 4th Infantry Division (Mechanized)
Assistant S-3 (Operations), 1st Brigade, 4th Infantry Division (Mechanized)
Schofield Barracks, Hawaii
Commander of C Company, 1st Battalion, 19th Infantry, 25th Infantry Division
Commander, Combat Support Company, 1st Battalion, 19th Infantry, 25th Infantry Division
Assistant S-3 (Operations), 1st Brigade, 25th Infantry Division
Fort Hood, Texas
Materiel Officer, Armor Support Battalion (General Support), 13th Support Command (Combat)
Executive Officer, Armor Support Battalion (General Support), 13th Support Command (Combat)
S-3 (Operations), 1st Battalion, 5th Cavalry, 1st Cavalry Division
Executive Officer, 1st Battalion, 5th Cavalry, 1st Cavalry Division
Fort Benning, Georgia
Chief, Bradley Fighting Vehicle New Equipment Training Team
Doctrine Writer and Chief, Doctrine Division, United States Army Infantry School
Germany (June 1991)
Commander, 1st Battalion, 15th Infantry, 3d Infantry Division (Mechanized), United States Army Europe and Seventh Army
Camp H.M. Smith, Hawaii
Plans Officer for Programs, Requirements, and Force Structure, J5, United States Pacific Command
Fort Stewart, Georgia
Commander, 1st Brigade, 3d Infantry Division (Mechanized) until August 1998
Germany
Chief of Staff, V Corps
Deputy Chief of Staff (Operations), Allied Command Europe Rapid Reaction Corps

Retirement
MG Brandenburg's retirement ceremony was held at Fort Shafter, Hawaii, on January 5, 2008, and his retirement became effective on March 1, 2008.  The ceremony was hosted by Lieutenant General John M. Brown III, commanding general, United States Army Pacific Command. During the ceremony MG Brandenburg was awarded the Defense Distinguished Service Medal as well as letters of appreciation from President George W. Bush,  General George Casey, and General Richard Cody.

Education and awards
Major General Brandenburg holds a master's degree in management. He is a graduate of the Infantry Officer Basic Course, Armor Officer Advanced Course, Ordnance Officer Advanced Course, Command and General Staff College, and the Air War College.

His awards and decorations include the Defense Distinguished Service Medal, Defense Meritorious Service Medal, Legion of Merit (2 Oak Leaf Clusters), Bronze Star Medal, Meritorious Service Medal (4 Oak Leaf Clusters), Army Commendation Medal, Joint Service Achievement Medal, Expert Infantryman Badge, the Parachutist Badge, and the Ranger Tab.

  Defense Distinguished Service Medal
  Legion of Merit with two oak leaf clusters
  Defense Meritorious Service Medal
  Bronze Star
  Meritorious Service Medal with four oak leaf clusters
  Army Commendation Medal
  Joint Service Achievement Medal
  Expert Infantryman Badge
  Parachutist Badge
  Ranger Tab

References

 
 

Year of birth missing (living people)
Living people
People from Elloree, South Carolina
Military personnel from South Carolina
Recipients of the Legion of Merit
United States Army generals
United States Army personnel of the Iraq War
United States Army Command and General Staff College alumni
Recipients of the Defense Distinguished Service Medal
The Citadel, The Military College of South Carolina alumni